John Martin Stapleton (born 24 February 1946) is an English journalist and broadcaster. He is known for his work as a presenter and reporter on ITV breakfast television (TV-am, GMTV and Daybreak) in addition to hosting Nationwide and Watchdog for the BBC.

He won the Royal Television Society's News Presenter of the Year award for 2003, and was married to the late presenter Lynn Faulds Wood. Together they presented Watchdog between 1985 and 1993.

Early life
Stapleton was born in Oldham, Lancashire. His father Frank was secretary of the local co-operative and his mother, June was a part-time primary school teacher. Stapleton was educated at Diggle Primary School and Hulme Grammar School, Oldham and St John's College of Further Education, Manchester where he did "A" levels. He did not go to university, but started working as a trainee reporter at the age of seventeen on the now defunct Eccles and Patricroft Journal. He was later indentured to the Oldham Evening Chronicle for three years before moving onto the Daily Sketch, first in Manchester and then London.

Career
Stapleton's career began on local newspapers in North West England, before becoming a staff reporter on the Daily Sketch in Fleet Street. His first job in television was as a researcher and script writer on This Is Your Life, presented at the time by Eamonn Andrews.
 
He subsequently worked as a reporter on the Thames TV regional news magazine show Today from 1971 until 1975. In May 1972 he reported for the "Today" programme on the very last speedway meeting at the famous West Ham track. He joined the BBC Nationwide programme in 1975 as a reporter, and then became one of the main presenters from 1977 until 1980. While on Nationwide he also carried out major investigations into council corruption in South Wales and protection rackets in Northern Ireland. He also compered a number of one-off light entertainment shows for the BBC, including the Miss United Kingdom beauty pageant. From 1980 until 1983, he was a correspondent on the BBC's Panorama and Newsnight programmes, reporting from trouble spots such as the Middle East and El Salvador before working for three months as Newsnight's correspondent in Argentina during the Falklands War. From 1983 to 1985, he worked at TV-am as a reporter and as a presenter of Good Morning Britain. In 1986, John rejoined the BBC, where he presented the BBC One peak time consumer programme Watchdog until 1993, alongside his wife Lynn Faulds Wood. John was also during this time a presenter for the BBC's Breakfast Time when, in 1986, the programme switched over to a news format.

In 1993, Stapleton returned to ITV to front the live morning talk show The Time, The Place, and for four years he presented the ITV Sunday morning programme My Favourite Hymns, in which he interviewed a wide variety of guests about their faith and its impact on their lives. Archbishop Desmond Tutu, Earl Spencer, Princess Michael of Kent, the former South African president F.W. De Klerk, the author Maya Angelou and Coronation Street'''s William Roache were amongst his many guests.
   
In 1998, Stapleton joined the ITV breakfast programme GMTV as a presenter of the Newshour. In 1997, Stapleton, along with Sir Trevor McDonald, presented the live and controversial Monarchy debate for ITV in front of three thousand people at Birmingham's National Exhibition Centre 
and at GMTV; he also anchored many major news stories. Among them, the war in Kosovo when he was based on the Albanian border covering the refugee crisis. This was followed by his anchoring four American elections, the Boxing Day 2004 tsunami in South East Asia, Pope John Paul II's funeral in Rome and Hurricane Katrina in New Orleans. 

In 2003, he appeared on a celebrity edition in Series 13 of Who Wants To Be A Millionaire alongside GMTV colleague Lorraine Kelly.  The episode was aired on 19 April 2003, where they won £8,000 for charity.

In 2004, he was made the Royal Television Society's News Presenter of the Year – largely for his work on GMTV covering the 2003 war in Iraq and interviews he conducted with political party leaders including the then Prime Minister Tony Blair. He returned to Iraq to front two special programmes for GMTV commemorating the fifth anniversary of the war. He is also a reporter for the prime time ITV Tonight programme. Stapleton has over the years also presented many regional news and current affairs programmes including the BBC's London Plus, Facing South for Meridian and Central Weekend Live for Central TV.GMTV stars Penny Smith and John Stapleton leave the sofa in cut backs. Daily Mirror. London. 4 March 2010.

Stapleton has interviewed every British Prime Minister since James Callaghan in the 1970s and is one of the contributors to the BBC series Grumpy Old Men. He currently presents three political discussion programmes for ITV Central, The Lobby, transmitted in the Midlands, Last Orders for ITV Yorkshire and the London Debate transmitted in London and the South East.

In 2010, John joined the newly established ITV Breakfast programme Daybreak as their Special Correspondent. During his time with the programme, Stapleton was also a part-time presenter. In 2014, it was announced that Daybreak was to come to an end after four years of broadcasting. It would be replaced by a new breakfast programme Good Morning Britain where he remained until July 2015. He still works in radio, standing in for other presenters on LBC, facilitates major conferences, appears on TV as a pundit for the BBC News Channel, and writes for newspapers.

Personal life
He only has one kidney that functions properly. In April 2008 he revealed in a report for the BBC's The One Show th''at when he was younger he suffered from the eating disorder anorexia nervosa.

He met his wife Lynn Faulds Wood in Richmond in 1971. They lived in St Margarets and were married for 43 years until her death in 2020. They had a son, Nick, born in 1987.

He has been a supporter of Manchester City for more than 60 years, ever since his father took him to see Stanley Matthews play for Blackpool against City at their old Maine Road ground in the 1950s.

References

External links
 Official website
 
 

1946 births
Alumni of the University of Central Lancashire
English television presenters
GMTV presenters and reporters
ITV Breakfast presenters and reporters
Living people
People from Oldham
People educated at Oldham Hulme Grammar School
Beauty pageant hosts